Saint-Nicolas-de-Macherin is a commune in the Isère department within Auvergne-Rhône-Alpes in southeastern France. The area of the commune is 1,060 hectares and the altitude lies between 447 and 952 meters.

The town is located 5 km from Voiron, which is the seat of the canton. It is 28 km north-west of Grenoble, 90 km from Lyon, and 510 km from Paris.

Population

Demograhy 
Information on the population size has been carried out in the municipality since 1793. In 2017, the commune had 938 inhabitants, a 5.9% increase since 2011.

Housing 
According to figures from Insee, 91.6% of households live in single-family houses, compared to 8.4% in apartments. 94% of housing are main residences, 1.7% are second homes and the rest being vacant at the time of the survey in 2013.

21% of housing was built before 1919, while 62% was built between 1971 and 2005.

Places of interest 

 Château de Hautefort - the oldest building in the town, now divided into apartments.
 Pied Barlet - ruins of the ancient fortress from the 13th century.
 Chapel of Hautefort castle 
 Church of Saint Nicolas, rebuilt between 1885 and 1889, designed by architect Jean-Francois Pichat.

Economy 
In 2013, 4.1% of the active population was unemployed. This is low in comparison to the department unemployment rate of 11.2% for the same period.

57 businesses were operating in the town as of 1 January 2015, including 10 farms. The SITPM (Société Industrielle des Tissages Paul Merle) employs 58 people and manufactures fabrics. This factory was created in 1853 under the name of Usine de Tissage de Sainte-Marie d'Hautefort. The site covers 15,000m² and has more than 130 automated looms.

The town is part of the geographical area of production and transformation of Bois de Chartreuse, the first AOC of the wood sector in France.

Administration

Notable people 

 Paul Picard - deputy for Isère, born and died in the town.
 Amédée de Foras - politician and diplomat, married and lived in the town at the Château de Hautefort.
 Family of Mourand de Jouffrey - descendants of Jean-Antione Morand de Jouffrey, who worked in Lyon (1727-1794) and created the 6th arrondissement (Brotteaux). A bridge, as well as a car park, still bear his name. His son, Antoine Morand de Jouffrey, was appointed the attorney general of the king at the Lyon finance office in 1785.

See also
Communes of the Isère department

References
 

Communes of Isère
Isère communes articles needing translation from French Wikipedia